Gangoku Kankei was a Sōtō Zen priest of the Edo period. He was the founding abbot of Shinpo-ji temple (新豊寺) in Nagoya Prefecture. The prominent modern Zen teachers Dainin Katagiri and Sawaki Kōdō both trace their lineages back to Gangoku.

References

Zen Buddhist priests
Soto Zen Buddhists
1682 births
1768 deaths